The following is a list of Odonata of Nepal. One hundred and eighty-five species from seventeen families are listed.

This list is primarily based on Graham Vick's 1989 list with some recent additions and a modernized classification.

Suborder Anisozygoptera

Family Epiophlebiidae
Epiophlebia laidlawi - Himalayan relict dragonfly

Suborder Zygoptera – damselflies

Family Amphipterygidae – diplebiidae
Philoganga montana

Family Calopterygidae – jewelwings
Neurobasis chinensis chinensis - stream glory
Caliphaea confusa
Vestalis gracilis gracilis - clear-winged forest glory

Family Chlorocyphidae
Aristocypha cuneata syn A. bifenestrata
Aristocypha quadrimaculata
Aristocypha trifasciata syn A. bifasciata
Aristo (Para) cypha unimaculata
Libellago lineata lineata - river heliodor
Heliocypha biforata

Family Euphaeidae
Allophaea (Euphaea) ochracea
Anisopleura comes
Anisopleura lestoides
Anisopleura subplatystyla
Bayadera indica
Bayadera longicauda
Bayadera hyaline

Family Synlestidae
Megalestes major - giant green spreadwing
Megalestes irma

Family Lestidae
Indolestes cyaneus
Lestes dorothea
Lestes praemorsus praemorsus - sapphire-eyed spreadwing

Family Coenagrionidae
Aciagrion hisopa
Aciagrion olympicum
Aciagrion pallidum - pale slender dartlet
Aciagrion occidentale - green-striped slender dartlet
Aciagrion approximans - Indian violet dartlet
Agriocnemis clauseni
Agriocnemis lacteola - milky dartlet
Agriocnemis pygmaea - pygmy dartlet
Agriocnemis femina - pinhead dartlet
Enallagma parvum - azure dartlet
Paracercion calamorum - dusky lilysquatter
Paracercion malayanum - Malay lillysquatter
Ceriagrion azureum - azure marsh dart
Ceriagrion cerinorubellum - orange-tailed marsh dart  
Ceriagrion fallax fallax - black-tailed marsh dart
Ceriagrion fallax cerinomelas
Ceriagrion coromandelianum - Coromandel marsh dart
Ceriagrion olivaceum - rusty marsh dart
Coenagrion exclamationis
Ischnura rubilio - western golden dartlet
Ischnura montana
Ischnura elegans - common bluetail
Ischnura forcipata - forcipate dartlet
Ischnura rufostigma - ruby dartlet
Ischnura nursei - pixie dartlet
Onychargia atrocyana - black marsh dart
Pseudagrion australasiae
Pseudagrion decorum - three-lined dart
Pseudagrion microcephalum - blue grass dart
Pseudagrion rubriceps - saffron-faced blue dart 
Pseudagrion spencei

Family Platycnemididae – featherlegs
Coeliccia renifera
Calicnemia doonensis carmine
Calicnemia eximia
Calicnemia miniata
Calicnemia mortoni
Calicnemia nipalica

Calicnemia pulverulans
Copera vittata - blue bush dart
Copera marginipes - yellow bush dart

Family Platystictidae – forest damsels
Drepanosticta carmichaeli - Indo-Chinese blue reedtail

Family Protoneuridae
Prodasineura autumnalis - black threadtail
Prodasineura odoneli

Suborder Anisoptera – dragonflies

Family Gomphidae
Anisogomphus bivittatus
Anisogomphus occipitalis - Shivalik clubtail
Anisogomphus orites
Burmagomphus hasimaricus
Burmagomphus sivalikensis
Davidius aberrans aberrans
Davidius delineates
Ictinogomphus angulosus
Ictinogomphus kishori
Ictinogomphus pertinax
Ictinogomphus rapax - Indian common clubtail
Macrogomphus montanus
Macrogomphus seductus
Microgomphus phewataali
Nepogomphus modestus
Lamelligomphus biforceps
Scalmogomphus bistrigatus
Onychogomphus cerastes
Nychogomphus duaricus
Onychogomphus risi
Onychogomphus schmidti
Onychogomphus saundersii
Paragomphus lindgreni
Paragomphus lineatus
Perissogomphus stevensi
Platygomphus dolabratus
Stylogomphus inglisi

Family Aeshnidae
Aeshna petalura petalura
Anaciaeschna jaspidea - rusty darner
Anaciaeschna martini
Anaciaeschna donaldi
Anax guttatus - blue-tailed green darner
Anax indicus - lesser green emperor
Anax nigrofasciatus nigrolineatus
Anax immaculafrons
Anax parthenope
Cephalaeschna acutifrons
Cephalaeschna klapperichi
Cephalaeschna masoni
Cephalaeschna orbifrons
Cephalaeschna viridifrons
Gynacantha bayadera - parakeet darner
Gynacantha incisura
Gynacantha khasiaca
Gynacanthaeschna sikkima
Oligoaeschna martini
Periaeschna unifasciata
Polycanthagyna erythromelas

Family Cordulegastridae
Anotogaster basalis palampurensis
Anotogaster gregoryi
Anotogaster nipalensis
Chlorogomphus atkinsoni
Chlorogomphus mortoni
Chlorogomphus olympicus
Chlorogomphus preciosus
Chlorogomphus selysi
Cordulegaster brevistigma brevistigma
Neallogaster hermionae
Neallogaster latifrons
Neallogaster ornata

Family Corduliidae
Epophthalmia frontalis frontalis
Idionyx stevensi

Family Macromiidae
Macromia cingulata
Macromia flavocolorata
Macromia moorei moorei
Macromia sombui
Somatochlora nipalensis

Family Libellulidae

Acisoma panorpoides panorpoides - trumpet-tail
Aethriamanta brevipennis - scarlet marsh hawk
Brachythemis contaminata - ditch jewel
Brachydiplax sobrina - little blue marsh hawk
Barchydiplax chalybea - rufous-backed marsh hawk
Bradinophyga geminata - granite ghost
Cratilla lineata - emerald-banded skimmer
Cratilla metallica
Crocothemis erythaea - broad skimmer
Crocothemis servilia - scarlet skimmer
Diplacodes lefebvreii
Diplacodes nebulosa - black-tipped ground skimmer
Diplacodes trivialis - blue ground skimmer
Libellula quadrimaculata
Lyriothemis bivittata
Nannophya pygmaea
Neurothemis fulvia - fulvous forest skimmer
Neurothemis intermedia - paddyfield parasol
Neurothemis tullia tullia - pied paddy skimmer
Orthetrum glaucum- blue marsh hawk
Orthetrum japonicum internum
Orthetrum luzonicum - tri-coloured marsh hawk
Orthetrum pruinosum neglectum - crimson-tailed marsh hawk
Orthetrum coerulescens anceps - keeled skimmer
Orthetrum sabina - green marsh hawk
Orthetrum taeniolatum - small skimmer
Orthetrum triangulare triangulare - blue-tailed forest hawk
Orthetrum lineostigma
Onychothemis testaceum testaceum
Palpopleura sexmaculata sexmaculata - blue-tailed yellow skimmer
Pantala flavescens - wandering glider
Potamarcha congenera - yellow-tailed ashy skimmer
Pseudotramea prateri
Rhodothemis rufa - rufous marsh glider
Rhyothemis plutonia - greater blue-wing
Rhyothemis triangularis - lesser blue-wing
Rhyothemis variegata variegata - common picturewing
Selysiothemis nigra
Sympetrum commixtum
Sympetrum decoloratum
Sympetrum fonscolombei
Sympetrum haematoneura
Sympetrum hypomelas
Sympetrum orientale
Tholymis tillarga
Tramea basilaris burmeisteri - red marsh trotter
Tramea limbata simiata - black marsh trotter
Tramea virginia
Trithemis aurora - crimson marsh glider
Trithemis festiva - black stream glider
Trithemis pallidinervis - long-legged marsh glider
Urothemis signata signata - greater crimson glider
Zygonyx iris - emerald cascader

See also
List of butterflies of Nepal
Cerambycidae of Nepal
Zygaenidae of Nepal
Wildlife of Nepal

References

Further reading

Nepal
Nepal
Odonata
Insects of Nepal